is a 1993 Japanese comedy film directed by Yoji Yamada. It stars Kiyoshi Atsumi as Torajirō Kuruma (Tora-san), and Keiko Matsuzaka as his love interest or "Madonna". Tora-san's Matchmaker is the forty-sixth entry in the popular, long-running Otoko wa Tsurai yo series.

Cast
 Kiyoshi Atsumi as Torajirō
 Chieko Baisho as Sakura
 Keiko Matsuzaka as Yoko Sakaide
 Hidetaka Yoshioka as Mitsuo Suwa
 Shimojo Masami as Tatsuzō Kuruma
 Chieko Misaki as Tsune Kuruma (Torajirō's aunt)
 Hisao Dazai as Boss (Umetarō Katsura)
 Gajirō Satō as Genkō
 Keiroku Seki as Ponshū

Critical appraisal
For their work in Tora-san's Matchmaker, the Japan Academy Prize awarded Yoji Yamada for Best Director and Screenplay, Yoshitaka Asama for Best Screenplay, and Isao Suzuki for Best Sound. Also nominated at the Japan Academy Prize were Yutaka Yokoyama and Mitsuo Degawa for Best Sound and Iwao Ishii for Best Editing. The German-language site molodezhnaja gives Tora-san's Matchmaker three and a half out of five stars.

Availability
Tora-san's Matchmaker was released theatrically on December 25, 1993. In Japan, the film was released on videotape in 1994 and 1996, and in DVD format in 2000 and 2008.

References

Bibliography

English

German

Japanese

External links
 Tora-san's Matchmaker at www.tora-san.jp (official site)

1993 films
1993 comedy films
Films directed by Yoji Yamada
1990s Japanese-language films
Otoko wa Tsurai yo films
Shochiku films
Films with screenplays by Yôji Yamada
Japanese sequel films
1990s Japanese films